WNEE 88.1 FM is a Christian radio station serving the Athens, Georgia area. The station broadcasts a Contemporary Christian music format and is owned by Community Public Radio, Inc.

References

External links

NEE